Marcelo H. del Pilar National High School is one of the largest secondary schools in Central Luzon in terms of population. It has an average population of almost 10,000 students from Junior and Senior High School and 350 teachers. MHPNHS is one of the oldest secondary schools in the Philippines established in 1905. Its Junior High School Department offers the five curricular endorsed by the Department of Education: Special Program in Science and Technology Engineering, Special Program in Journalism, Special Program in Foreign Language, Special Program in the Arts, Special Program in Sports and Basic Education Program.The Senior High School Department is established in 2016 and offers Academic, Technical, Vocational and Livelihood, Arts and Design and Sports tracks. Under these tracks are the various strands, namely:  Humanities and Social Sciences (HUMSS), Science, Technology, Engineering and Mathematics (STEM), Accountancy, Business and Management (ABM), Arts and Design (AAD), Sports, and various TVL strands.

Bulacan High School

Bulacan High School had its beginning in the progressive town of Baliuag, where it was temporarily located early in 1902. Here a number of students, mostly boys, representing but a few towns of the province, together with a class of twenty who had made some progress in Spanish schools, were placed in a room of a private dwelling under the charge of two American teachers. It was called High School in order to induce the attendance of those pupils who had made some instruction in the instruction in Spanish "Colegios" and were unwilling to attend an elementary school under its true name. These young men being only eighty-seven members. During its short period of existence, it had accomplished much, for it had sent forth many young teachers to the province.

In 1903, there were two hundred fifty pupils, and the number of teachers was increased to seven. Among the activities of the school was the organization of a literary society.

In 1904, there were two hundred twenty-seven pupils, and six teachers. Two literary societies were organized and for the next three years were an important factor i building up the school and creating an interest in English. The pupils were classified as sections A, B, C, D, E, and F, and the work corresponded to our present fourth, fifth and sixth grades. This year plans and specifications for a new P32,000.00 High School at Malolos, Bulacan were completed and the money for the building was appropriated from the provincial funds.

In 1905, the enrollment reached two hundred sixty-six. The school was reorganized as to give the full intermediate course and the first year of the secondary course.

This marks the beginning of the High School proper. The first chorus work was done this year, and physical training and athletics were introduced in accordance with the plan of the Bureau of Education. A tennis court was made and a baseball team was organized; also the first instruction in sewing was given this year, the girls furnishing their own materials.

The Engineering and Science Education Program (ESEP)
History
The Engineering and Science Education Program (ESEP), formerly the Special Science Class, is a brainchild of the former Department of Education Culture and Sports Superintendent Bienvenido F. Yap. The Special Science Class formally opened in the school year 1986–1987 within three provincial high schools in Bulacan—Marcelo H. del Pilar High School, Mariano Ponce High School and San Miguel High School.

The retirement of Superintendent Bienvenido Yap also signaled the end of the implementation of the Special Science Class. Its abolition paved way for the now Engineering and Science Education Program, a new and revised science-oriented curriculum for several chosen schools.

Our School became one of the 110 ESEP networks of secondary schools nationwide selected by the Science Education Institute and the Department of Science and Technology (SEI-DOST) in coordination with the Bureau of Secondary Education, Department of Education, Culture and Sports.

The Engineering and Science Education Program (ESEP) is a science and mathematics-oriented curriculum devised for a special secondary education. It was created with the purpose of giving an education highly enriched in science and mathematics to exceptionally bright students. The MHPNHS-ESEP, with its competent faculty and staff, continues to produce competent professionals in the sciences, engineering, and mathematics and other fields. (from the student's handbook of the ESEP curriculum written by Dr. Ma. Victoria C. Vivo)

Mission
The MHPNHS-ESEP offers an education that is humanistic in spirit, global in perspective, and patriotic in orientation. It is based on an enhanced, challenging and innovative curriculum that provides an educational plan with emphasis on math, science and technology.
The MHPNHS-ESEP engenders in a student a passion for learning and shapes him to be an independent, responsible, educated and self-directed individual, working towards the realization of his dreams and so becoming a productive citizen of our country.(from the student's handbook of the ESEP curriculum written by Dr. Ma. Victoria C. Vivo)

Implementing Policies and Guidelines
Admission
The students shall be admitted to the program based on the following requirements:
Elementary pupils who belong to the top ten (10) of the graduating class for schools with one hundred or less pupils and ten percent (10%) of the graduating class for schools with more than one hundred (100) graduating pupils. These pupils should present a certification from the Principal that they belong to this group.

Retention in the Program
To remain in the program, the student should obtain a general average of 85% in Science, Mathematics and English and 83% in the rest of the subjects without grade lower than 80% in any grading period. Failure to meet the grade requirements shall be a cause of transfer to the regular class.

Selection shall be done in two (2) stages to be conducted by the school as follows:
	Stage 1 – Preliminary elimination by the school including the interview process.
	Stage 2- Written examination prepared by BSE.

 Transferring in the Program
Students enrolled in these schools are allowed to transfer laterally, at any curriculum year level (except in the fourth year) to another S & T Oriented (ESEP) High Schools, as long as the grade requirement is maintained.

Official Publications
Ang Malaya - The official Filipino publication of Marcelo H. del Pilar National High School.
The Republic - The official English publication of Marcelo H. del Pilar National High School.
The two publications are highly respected school papers in the Central Luzon. The two papers and the editors are noted for its numerous distinction in the Division Schools Press Conference, the Regional Schools Press Conference and the National Schools Press Conference.

Some of the most notable achievements of these publications were the following:
 The Republic - Finalist, Best School Organ (Secondary Level), 2016 Catholic Mass Media Awards 
 The Republic - Best School Paper of the Philippines, 1995
 The Republic - Best School Paper of the Philippines, 2015
 The Republic - 2013 Outstanding School Paper in Region III
 Ang Malaya - 2013 Outstanding School Paper in Region III
 Ang Malaya - 2014 Outstanding School Paper in Region III
 Ang Malaya - 4th Pinakamahusay na Pahinang Lathalain, 2015 National Schools Press Conference
 Ang Malaya - Pinakamahusay sa Pag-aanyo ng Pahina, 2015 National Schools Press Conference
On the other hand, two of the advisers of these publications were hailed as Outstanding School Paper Advisers in the country, they were:
 Mrs. Bernadette F. Tamayo of The Republic - 1995 Most Outstanding School Paper Adviser in the Philippines (served as The Republic's adviser for more than 17 years)
 Mrs. Jocelyn M. Manahan of Ang Malaya - 2014 Most Outstanding School Paper Adviser in the Philippines (started serving as Ang Malaya's adviser on 2006 up to present)

Clubs and Organizations
Supreme Student Government (SSG) is the highest student governing body at MHPNHS.
Science Department
Youth for Environment Schools Organization (YES-O)
Kilusang La Solidaridad sa Agham (KLSA)
Mathematics Department
Mathematics Club
English Department
English Club
Theater Guild
Book Club
DelPilarian Debate Society
Filipino Department
Klub Plaridel
Kapisanan ng Diwa at Panitik (KADIPAN)
Social Studies Department
Kolab ng mga Mag-aaral sa Araling Panlipunan (AP KOLAB)
Values Department
Values Formation Club (VFC)
We Advocate Time Consciousness and Honesty (WATCH)
Peer Facilitators Club
Honesty Club
Music, Arts, Physical Education and Health (MAPEH) Department
CAT-I
Visual Arts Club
Music Family
MHPNHS Chorale
MHPNHS Brass Band
Strings Ensemble
MHPNHS Performing Arts Group
Koro del Pilar
MHPNHS Angklung Ensemble
MHPNHS Rondalla
MHPNHS Flute Ensemble
MHPNHS Drum and Lyre Band
Creative Dance Group
MHPNHS Dance Troupes
Dance Sports Club
Folk Dance Troupe
Technology and Livelihood Education (TLE) Department
Information and Communications Technology (ICT) Club
Future Farmer of the Philippines (FFP) Club
Future Homemakers of the Philippines (FHP)
Youth Entrepreneur's Club (YECS)
Senior High School
KOLAB Social Science Education Collective
OBRA Arts and Design Club
I Research and Innovate in Science and Engineering (IRISE)
Junior Business Executives Association (JBEA)
Academic Circle
MHPNHS Aklatang Gabriel A. Bernardo
EX LIBRIS Library Volunteers

Achievements
MHPHS Rondalla - Most Outstanding Performer NAMCYA National Music Festival 2000 / Samiweng 2000 National Music Festival
First Place November 19, 2009, Poetry Performed Competition at the Baler 400: the Quadricentennial Anniversary of the Town of Baler, Province of Aurora
MHPNHS Rondalla - Champion Feb 17, 2011, Rondal-Awit Competition at the 10th Musikahan Festival held at Tagum City, Davao.
MHPNHS Koro Del Pilar - Champion (Classical Category) February 2012, Children's Choir Competition at the 11th Musikahan sa Tagum in Tagum City, Davao Del Norte, under Mr. Conrado "Radie" Santiago.

Notable alumni

Government
Batch 1939 Tomas S. Martin - Governor, Bulacan (1958 to 1963)
Batch 1958 Aurelio S. Plamenco - Vice Governor, Bulacan (1998 to 2007)
Batch 1968 Vicente C. Cruz Sr.- Board Member, District 1 Bulacan (2007–present)
Batch 1968 Danilo Domingo - Mayor, City of Malolos (2001–2010)
Batch 1976 Paquito Ochoa, Jr. - Executive Secretary (2010–2016)

Film, Arts and Entertainment
Batch 1967 Jaime Florcruz - Former CNN Bureau Chief, Beijing 
Batch 1981 Jerry Lopez Sineneng - Film Director and Writer

Science and Education
Batch 1926 Dr. Geminiano T. De Ocampo - Class Valedictorian, Ophthalmologist, National Scientist (1982), a.k.a. "Father of Modern Philippine Ophthalmology"
Batch 1909 Gabriel A. Bernardo - Born in Malolos, March 14, 1891. Father of Philippine Librarianship

Location Map

Aerial Map

References

History of Bulacan High School by Damaso Figueroa

External links

http://www.mhphs.com/ 
http://www.mhphs94.net/
https://web.archive.org/web/20080724165926/http://bulacan.gov.ph/government/vicerely.asp

http://www.rotaryfirst100.org/ 

High schools in Bulacan
Schools in Malolos
1905 establishments in the Philippines
Educational institutions established in 1905